Club Esportiu Campos is a football team based in Campos, Illes Balears. Founded in 1968, the team plays in Tercera División Group 11. 

The club's home ground is Estadio Municipal.

Season to season

16 seasons in Tercera División
30 seasons in Regional Preferente

External links
Official Site 
Futbolme team profile 
CE Campos on FFIB.es 
Profile in old website  (Internet Archive)
History in old website  (Internet Archive)

Football clubs in the Balearic Islands
Sport in Mallorca
Association football clubs established in 1968
1968 establishments in Spain